Dryosaurids were primitive iguanodonts. They are known from Middle Jurassic to Early Cretaceous rocks of Africa, Europe, and North America.

Phylogeny
Until recently many dryosaurids have been regarded as dubious (Callovosaurus and Kangnasaurus) or as species of the type member, Dryosaurus (Dysalotosaurus, Elrhazosaurus and Valdosaurus). However, more recent studies redescribe these genera as valid. The cladogram below follows Paul M. Barrett, Richard J. Butler, Richard J. Twitchett and Stephen Hutt (2011).

References

Iguanodonts
Middle Jurassic first appearances
Cretaceous extinctions
Prehistoric dinosaur families
Taxa named by Angela Milner
Taxa named by David B. Norman